Ye Ruiheng (born 26 May 1998) is a Chinese footballer currently playing as a goalkeeper for Jiangxi Beidamen.

Career statistics

Club
.

Notes

References

1998 births
Living people
Footballers from Guangdong
Chinese footballers
Association football goalkeepers
China League Two players
China League One players
Jiangxi Beidamen F.C. players